MS Olga Mærsk was a cargo ship belonging to the fleet of Danish shipping company A.P. Møller Mærsk. She was launched on 18 December 1948 and completed in July 1949.

In the following year, she was handed over to Mærsk and was part of its fleet until 1968. She was then acquired by Mermaid Maritime and renamed Valentine. She was subsequently acquired first by Liberty SS Co Ltd as North Sea in 1974 and finally as Man Mang  for Man Ming Maritime Ltd in 1975. She was broken up in Kaohsiung, Taiwan in 1979.

References

Merchant ships of Denmark
Ships of Maersk
1948 ships
Ships built in Odense